Sander marinus, the estuarine perch, also called sea pikeperch or sea zander, is a species of ray-finned fish in the family Percidae which includes the perches, ruffes and darters. It is found in eastern Europe in the Black Sea and the Caspian Sea in Azerbaijan, Bulgaria, Iran, Kazakhstan, Moldova, Romania, Russia, Turkmenistan, and Ukraine. It lives in brackish water and rarely enters rivers.

References

marinus
Fish of Asia
Fish of Europe
Fish of the Black Sea
Fish of the Caspian Sea
Fish described in 1828
Taxa named by Georges Cuvier
Taxonomy articles created by Polbot